Baħar iċ-Ċagħaq is an urban village in Malta situated between the limits of Madliena, Magħtab, Għargħur and Pembroke. The area is situated at the mouth of the island's longest valley called 'Wied il-Kbir'.  The name Baħar iċ-Ċagħaq in Maltese can be translated to the meaning 'sea of pebbles' in English. It has a population of approximately 1250 people.

History and facilities

Baħar iċ-Ċagħaq is named after a long stretch of rocky coast characterised by a large number of pebbles and sharp rocks. The area was used as a camping site by British forces during the British colonial period of the islands.

Two century-old chapels are found in the area, one of which has been abandoned. A modern central parish church and Franciscan retreat house are also located in the village. Opposite Baħar iċ-Ċagħaq is a marine entertainment centre which also has a dolphin show. Baħar iċ-Ċagħaq also contains a small number of bars and restaurants and a boy scout camping site.

The village was for much of the late twentieth century home to the White Rocks tourist complex. However, by the early 21st century this had fallen into disrepair and was no longer used. A proposal to convert the complex into a sports complex was announced by the Maltese government in 2010, but little progress had been made by June 2011.

When Local Councils were established it was decided by central government that the village should form part of the Local Council of Naxxar. However the parish district of the town falls under the neighbouring Għargħur. In the last 15 years the land development increased by threefold and Maltese people continue to purchase and develop property in the area.

Malta's sound mirror
The only sound mirror built outside of the UK is found near Baħar iċ-Ċagħaq at Magħtab. These buildings were sound early warning radar systems built before World War II.

Zones in Baħar iċ-Ċagħaq
Qalet Marku
San Ġwann Evanġelista
Wied il-Faħam
White Rocks

Transport
Baħar iċ-Ċagħaq is located on the Triq il-Kosta (Coast Road), Triq tal-Madliena (Madliena Road) and Triq Sant' Andrija (St Andrew's Road). 

The village is served by three bus routes linking it to Valletta, Sliema and Buġibba.

References

External links
 Aerial view
 Naxxar Local Council

Populated places in Malta
Naxxar